The final of the Women's 200 metres Freestyle event at the European LC Championships 1997 was held on Wednesday 20 August 1997 in Seville, Spain.

Finals

Qualifying heats

Remarks

See also
1996 Women's Olympic Games 200m Freestyle
1997 Women's World Championships (SC) 200m Freestyle

References
 scmsom results
 swimrankings
 La Gazzetta Archivio

F